Al Ramadi Sport Club, is an Iraqi football club based in Ramadi, in Anbar province, that plays in Iraq Division one.

History
Al-Ramadi Club played in the Iraqi Premier League. In the 1995–96 season they won the Al-Nasr wal-Salam Cup, beating Al-Quwa Al-Jawiya 1–0 with a goal by Zuhair Abdul-Ridha, beating Al-Shorta 5–4 on penalties and then beating Al-Naft 3–0 in the final.

Al Ramadi Sired many players who represented Iraq team since its inception, but because of financial matters and matters of Anbar after 2003 led to the deterioration of the possibilities of the club.

Managerial history
  Ahmed Daham 
  Khamis Hammoud
  Haider Jabbar
  Khalid Mohammed Sabbar 
  Thair Jassam

See also 
 2021–22 Iraq FA Cup 
 2022–23 Iraq FA Cup

External links
 club's page on goalzz.com

1962 establishments in Iraq
Association football clubs established in 1962
Football clubs in Al-Anbar